Events from the year 1647 in Denmark.

Incumbents 
 Monarch – Christian IV

Events

Undated
  Prince Frederick organized a trading mission to Barbados.

Culture

Art
 The group portrait painting of Ole Worm and his family is completed.

Births
 1 September  Princess Anna Sophie of Denmark, princess (died 1717)

Deaths 
 2 June  Christian, Prince-Elect of Denmark, prince (born 1603)

References

External links

 
Denmark
Years of the 17th century in Denmark